= BestPrice Travel =

Vietnamese tourism company

- Industry: Tourism
- Founded: May 26, 2010; 16 years ago
- Headquarters: Hanoi, Vietnam
- Services: Hotel reservations; Flight booking; Travel tours
- Website: www.bestpricetravel.com

BestPrice Travel is a Vietnamese tourism company, established in 2010.

On May 21, 2024, BestPrice Travel launched its "Taste Vietnam" campaign in New York's Times Square, showcasing images of Vietnam to the world.

== Locations ==
The company has its main offices in Ho Chi Minh City and Hanoi, with two representative offices in Vietnam, Laos, Cambodia, Thailand and Myanmar.

== Awards and recognition ==
On December 29, 2019, BestPrice was recognized as one of the Top 10 winners in the Travelers’ Best Choice Awards 2019, based on votes from travelers. BestPrice also had the most online tour bookings in 2019.

In October 2023, BestPrice Travel received the Travelers' Choice Award from TripAdvisor, the world's largest travel community. At the time of the award, BestPrice's profile on TripAdvisor had over 2,425 reviews, with the majority of customers giving it the highest possible rating, resulting in an overall score of 5.0.

At the Vietnam International Travel Mart 2024, BestPrice Travel was awarded "Vietnam's Leading Domestic Tour Operator for 2022 and 2023" by the Vietnam Tourism Association. The company also received recognition as "Promising Travel Company of 2023" and "Travel Company with Effective Application of Information Technology in Management and Business in 2023", also awarded by the Vietnam Tourism Association.
